John Paul Braun (December 26, 1939 – June 10, 2011) was a pitcher in Major League Baseball. He played one game for the Milwaukee Braves in 1964.

Braun graduated from Madison West High School in 1957 where he played baseball, football and basketball. After high school, Braun played college basketball for the Chipola Indians before transferring to the University of Wisconsin.

References

External links

1939 births
2011 deaths
Major League Baseball pitchers
Milwaukee Braves players
Baseball players from Wisconsin
Sportspeople from Madison, Wisconsin
Austin Braves players
Boise Braves players
Cedar Rapids Braves players
Davenport Braves players
Denver Bears players
Eau Claire Bears players
Greenville Braves players
Wisconsin Badgers baseball players
Madison West High School alumni
Chipola Indians men's basketball players